Robert Dean Boyd (December 3, 1937 – August 28, 2017) was a National Football League (NFL) cornerback who played for the Baltimore Colts in a nine-year career from 1960 to 1968.

When Boyd retired, he was one of eight players with fifty interceptions in NFL history; he was third all-time upon retirement, and only ten players have passed him in the half-century since 1968. He is one of four players with fifty interceptions who played less than ten years. One of three cornerbacks selected for the NFL 1960s All-Decade Team, Boyd is the only one not in the Pro Football Hall of Fame despite having more interceptions than each player.

College career
Boyd played as quarterback in college at the University of Oklahoma under Bud Wilkinson from 1958 to 1959. He also played as a defensive back and returned punts for the team.

NFL career
He was drafted by the Baltimore Colts in the 10th round of the 1960 NFL Draft. In his first season, he played in 11 games, while having 7 interceptions for 132 yards. The following season, he played in 14 games while having 2 interceptions. He also returned 18 punts for 173 yards (with 9.6 yards per return), finishing 4th in the former category and 3rd in the latter category in the league. In his next season, he played in every game once again while having 7 interceptions for 163 yards. He also recovered four fumbles along with returning 3 punts for 23 yards and having 2 carries for 13 yards. He played in 12 games in the 1963 season, but he had 3 interceptions for 17 yards along with recovering 2 fumbles for 34 yards and one touchdown. In the 1964 season, he had 9 interceptions for 185 yards, both career highs while also having one fumble recovery. He also one carry for 25 yards. He was named First-team All-Pro and the Pro Bowl in 1964. He played in his first playoff game that year, playing in the 1964 NFL Championship Game, which the Colts lost 27-0.

The following season, he had 9 interceptions for 78 yards with one touchdown and 2 fumble recoveries, leading the league in interceptions that year. He was named First-team All-Pro once again. In the Western Conference playoff against the Green Bay Packers, he had one interception for six yards in the controversial 13-10 loss. In his next season, he had 6 interceptions (7th in the league) for 114 yards and one touchdown while also having one fumble recovery. He was named to the First-team All-Pro by Pro Football Writer and UPI and the Second-team All-Pro by the New York Daily News and the Associated Press. In his penultimate season, he had 6 interceptions for 145 yards and one touchdown and one fumble recovery. He was named 1st Team All-Conference by the Sporting News and to the 2nd Team by UPI. 1968 was his final season, and he had 8 interceptions for 160 yards and one touchdown while having a fumble recovery. He participated in the Colts' playoff run that season, playing in all three games. In the Western Conference Championship game, he had an interception off Joe Kapp, returning it for 20 yards. The Colts won the 1968 NFL Championship Game that year, beating the Cleveland Browns 34-0 to advance to Super Bowl III. In his final game, the Colts lost 16-7 to the New York Jets. After the season, he was named First-team All-Pro and to the Pro Bowl. He finished his career with 57 interceptions, which he returned for 994 yards and four touchdowns. He is tied (along with Mel Blount, Eugene Robinson, Johnny Robinson, and Everson Walls) for 13th in all-time interceptions. He also had 12 fumble recoveries.

In 2017, the Professional Football Researchers Association named Boyd to the PFRA Hall of Very Good Class of 2017

After football
Boyd retired after the season in order to join the coaching staff of the Colts for more money, which he accepted. He was on the staff led by Don McCafferty when they won Super Bowl V in 1970. After five years, he left coaching. He became partners with Johnny Unitas in the restaurant business in the city, doing so until he retired to his hometown of Garland, Texas with his wife in 1986. He was named to the National Football League 1960s All-Decade Team. Boyd died on August 28, 2017, of bladder cancer, in Garland, aged 79.

References

External links
 

1937 births
2017 deaths
People from Garland, Texas
Players of American football from Dallas
American football quarterbacks
American football cornerbacks
Garland High School alumni
Oklahoma Sooners football players
Baltimore Colts players
Western Conference Pro Bowl players
American color commentators
Deaths from bladder cancer
Deaths from cancer in Texas